Jackie Autry (born Jacqueline Evelyn Ellam; October 2, 1941) is the former owner of the Los Angeles Angels and widow of Gene Autry, actor, singer and businessman.

Early life 
On October 2, 1941, Autry was born in Newark, New Jersey.

Career
Autry started her career as a switchboard operator for Security National Bank. By age 24, Autry became an assistant manager of Operations. By age 30, Autry became a manager. By age 32, Autry became a vice president at the bank.

Autry served as the Honorary President of Major League Baseball's American League, from 2000 until 2015. Her main task was to present the American League Championship Award, the William Harridge Trophy, to the champion at the end of the ALCS as well as the ALCS MVP award. Autry is the only woman to ever serve on the Major League Baseball Executive Council, on its Oversight Committee, and as a member of the MLB board of directors.

Autry served as past President of the American Red Cross, was responsible as President for raising funds to build an independent Community Blood Bank at the Eisenhower Medical Center and served as its President for many years. The Blood Bank continues to serve seven area hospitals surrounding the Palm Springs area.

She continues to serve on the Board of Trustees at Eisenhower Medical Center and is the longest tenured Trustee having served since 1981. She is also a current member of the board of directors of the Barbara Sinatra Children's Center.

She is President of Gene Autry Music Publishing Companies which houses four publishing companies.

She is President of the Autry Foundation which was established by Gene and Ina Autry.  Funding from this Foundation provided the funds to build a world class western history museum contiguous to the Los Angeles Zoo. The . Museum now called the Autry National Center houses the Museum of the American West, Southwest Museum of the American Indian and the Institute for the Study of the American West. After 13 years she retired as Board chairman and now holds the position of chairman Emeritus and Lifetime Director.

She is Vice Chairman of Aerospace Technologies Group/ATGGroup/ which makes shades for corporate and commercial jets in which she is the majority stock holder.

She is a co-producer with partner Dennis Osborne in Control Freak Productions, which produces movies scripts that are generated internally.

Personal life
Now in semi-retirement, she handles investment portfolios, continues to attend Angels baseball games and enjoys traveling. She has a home in Palm Springs, California and also in Studio City, California.

In 2007 Autry won the Golden Boot Award for contributions to the genre of Western television and films. She played herself in the 2007 documentary, Gene Autry: White Hat, Silver Screen, and was the Executive Producer of the 2009 documentary, When Dream Worlds Collide.

On November 25, 2010 (Thanksgiving Day), Autry was driving a car in Palm Springs that hit and killed a pedestrian, Jesus Cardova Diaz, who was a homeless man. She received no civil or criminal charges as she was sober and the man she hit was jaywalking.

References

 

Major League Baseball executives
Living people
Anaheim Angels owners
1941 births
Businesspeople from Palm Springs, California
People from Studio City, Los Angeles